Albiès is a commune in the Ariège department in the Occitanie region of southwestern France.

The inhabitants of the commune are known as Albiésois or Albiésoises

Geography
Albiès is a long narrow commune oriented north–south about 25 km south by south-east of Foix and 15 km west by north-west of Ax-les-Thermes. It is traversed by Route Nationale N20 (E9) from Verdun in the north-west passing south of the village and continuing to the east. It is also possible to access the southern tip of the commune by road D522 from Les Cabannes to the west of the village via a tortuous mountain route west of the commune arriving at the southern tip of the commune where it terminates. The commune south of the N20 highway is heavily forested and inaccessible mountainous terrain. The village can be accessed by the Rue de Nappy going north from the N20 highway. A railway line passes through the village from west to east but there is no station in the commune. The nearest station is at Les Cabannes some 4 km to the west.

The Ariège river passes through the village flowing east parallel to the N20. The Ruisseau de Caychax flows from the north of the commune into the Ariège. The Ruisseau de Sauzelles rises in the south of the commune and flows north joining the Ruisseau de l'Oule which rises in the south-west and forms the southern portion of the western border before joining the Ruisseau de Sauzelles and becoming the Ruisseau de Lavel d'Albiès which is most of the western border before joining the Ravin de la Rescalbade and flowing into the Ariège as the Ruisseau de la Garganle. A separate stream - the Ruisseau de Garganle - forms part of the eastern border where it flows into the Ariège.

Administration

List of Successive Mayors

Population

Religious heritage
The Parish Church contains a Collection plate (17th century) which is registered as an historical object.

Notable people linked to the commune
Monseigneur Jean-Marie Vidal (1872-1940), Bishop of Pamiers, historian and writer.
Jacques Martiel (born 13 December 1946), journalist, publisher and Printer.

See also
Communes of the Ariège department

References

External links
Albiès on the old IGN website 
Albiès on Géoportail, National Geographic Institute (IGN) website 
Albies on the 1750 Cassini Map

Communes of Ariège (department)